Little Houghton may refer to the following places in England:

Little Houghton, Northamptonshire
Little Houghton, South Yorkshire
Little Houghton House, in Little Houghton, Northamptonshire
Littlehoughton, a a location in Northumberland, UK